Everybody Dance Now was an Australian television dance competition that aired on Network Ten. The first season premiered on 12 August 2012. The show was hosted by Sarah Murdoch, while Jason Derülo and Kelly Rowland served as dance masters. On 21 August 2012, Network Ten cancelled Everybody Dance Now due to poor ratings.

Format

Everybody Dance Now was open to solo acts, duos and groups of any age, style or size. They were divided into two teams, with each being led by the dance masters Jason Derülo and Kelly Rowland, who challenged, trained and mentored their acts. Each team had a dance captain; Team Kelly had Marco Pantic and Team Jason had Amy Campbell. The teams would face a studio audience in each episode "to do battle in a colosseum-style dance duel". During the heats stage of the competition, eight acts would perform during each episode in four duels. Once each of the duels are complete, the studio audience would vote for the act they think should progress through to the dance duel decider round. During this round, the studio audience would vote again for the two acts they think should win $10,000 and progress through to the finals. During the finals, dance acts would compete for the ultimate prize of $250,000.

Auditions

Heats

Episode 1 (12 August 2012)
Key
 – Team Jason
 – Team Kelly

Notes
Jason Derülo performed a medley of his songs "It Girl", "Pick Up the Pieces" and "Breathing".

Episode 2 (13 August 2012)
Key
 – Team Jason
 – Team Kelly

Episode 3 (14 August 2012)
Key
 – Team Jason
 – Team Kelly

Episode 4 (19 August 2012)
Key
 – Team Jason
 – Team Kelly

Ratings
The premiere episode of Everybody Dance Now, which aired simultaneously during the Nine Network's coverage of the 2012 Summer Olympics, was watched by 598,000 viewers. The second episode was watched by 304,000 viewers, lower than How to Train Your Dragon which aired on the Seven Network's digital channel 7mate. David Knox of TV Tonight noted that the ratings were also lower than the numbers pulled by The Voice (U.S.) and Excess Baggage on the Nine Network's digital channel Go!. On 14 August 2012, Network Ten's Chief Sales Officer Barry O'Brien told advertising publication B&T that he was disappointed with the show's ratings, saying "we think the format deserved better. Clearly we are coming out of the washout and the distraction of the Olympics." O'Brien also said that the future of Everybody Dance Now "hasn't been decided yet". The third episode ratings picked up slightly from the previous episode with 324,000 viewers. The fourth episode was watched by 385,000 viewers.

References

External links
 Everybody Dance Now at Network Ten

2012 Australian television seasons
Everybody Dance Now